Dyer is an English surname with early medieval origins, deriving from the trade of cloth dying. Dyer is also found in Ireland (Counties Sligo and Roscommon) as an Anglicization of the Gaelic surname in Ireland O Duibhir and Mac Duibhir. (O'Dyer / McDyer) These are both derived from the words dubh, which means black, and odhar or uidhir, which means uncolored.

Notable names include:

 Ainsworth Dyer, one of the victims of the Tarnak Farm incident
 Alex Dyer (footballer born 1965), English footballer 
 Alex Dyer (footballer born 1990), English footballer 
 Alexander Brydie Dyer (1815–1874), American soldier in a variety of 19th century wars
 Sir Alfred Dyer (1865–1947), British newspaper editor, politician, and company director
 Alvin R. Dyer (1903–1977), an apostle in The Church of Jesus Christ of Latter-day Saints and served as a member of the church's First Presidency from 1968 to 1970
 Amelia Dyer (1837–1896), Victorian nurse and baby-farmer hanged for murder
 Anne Dyer (born 1957), British Anglican priest and former Warden of Cranmer Hall, Durham
 Bert Dyer (born 1886), English footballer
 Bruce Dyer (born 1975), English footballer 
 Buddy Dyer, American politician, mayor of Orlando
 Charles Dyer (architect) (1794–1848), British architect
 Clay Dyer (born 1978), American professional sport bass fisherman
 Danny Dyer (born 1977), English television, film and theatre actor
 Dani Dyer (born 1996), English television personality, winner of Love Island 2018 and daughter of Danny
 Deborah Dyer (born 1967), known by the stage name Skin, English singer, an electronic music DJ, and occasional model
 Dennis Dyer (1914–1990), South African cricketer
 Eddie Dyer (1899–1964), American left-handed pitcher, manager and farm system official in Major League Baseball
 Sir Edward Dyer (1543–1607), English courtier and poet 
 Elinor Brent-Dyer (1894–1969), British author
 Eliphalet Dyer (1721–1807), American lawyer, jurist, and statesman
 Fred Dyer (1888–????), British boxer and entertainer
 Geoff Dyer (born 1958), English writer
 Geoffrey Dyer (born 1947, Australian artist
 George Dyer (disambiguation), a number of persons having the name
 George Dyer (poet) (1755–1841), English classicist and writer
 George Dyer (politician) (1802–1878), American physician and politician
 George P. Dyer (1876–1948), American football coach
 George Dyer (burglar) (c. 1933–1971), English burglar, lover of artist Francis Bacon
 George Dyer Weaver (1908–1986), Canadian politician, member of the House of Commons of Canada
 George Leland Dyer (1849–1914), American naval commander and governor of Guam
 Goudyloch E. Dyer (1919–2008), American politician
 Greg Dyer (born 1959), Australian cricketer 
 Gwynne Dyer (born 1943), London-based Canadian journalist, syndicated columnist and military historian
 Hector Dyer (1910–1990), American athlete and Olympian
 Henry Dyer (1848–1918), Scottish engineer and educator
 Herbert Dyer (1898–1974), English coppersmith 
 Isadore Dyer (1865–1920), American physician
 J. Milton Dyer (1870–1957), American architect
 Jack Dyer (1913–2003), nicknamed Captain Blood, Australian rules footballer
 Jane Dyer (born 1949), American author and illustrator
 Jerry Dyer, American politician and law enforcement officer
 Jesse Farley Dyer (1877–1955), American Medal of Honor recipient
 John Dyer (1699–1757), Welsh poet
 Johnny Dyer (1938–2014), American electric blues harmonicist and singer
 Joyce Dyer (born 1947), American writer of nonfiction and memoirs
 Julia Knowlton Dyer (1829–1927), American philanthropist
 Ken Dyer (1946–2010), American football player
 Kieron Dyer (born 1978), English international football (soccer) player
 Leonidas C. Dyer (1871–1957), American politician, activist and military officer
 Lloyd Dyer (born 1982), English footballer
 Louis Dyer (1851–1908), American educator and author
 Maria (Tarn) Dyer (c. 1803–1846), British Protestant Christian missionary to the Chinese in the Congregationalist tradition
 Mary Dyer (c. 1611–1660), colonial American Quaker religious martyr 
 Mary Marshall Dyer (1780–1867), voice for the Anti-Shakerism sentiment in rural New Hampshire
 Micajah Clark Dyer (1822–1891),Pioneer Aviator, flew before the Wright Brothers, his patent paved the way for flight in America today. https://airandspace.si.edu/support/wall-of-honor/micajah-clark-dyer 
Mike Dyer (disambiguation)
 Mike Dyer (baseball) (born 1966), retired Major League Baseball pitcher
 Mike Dyer (sportswriter) (born 1939), retired sportswriter 
 Michael Dyer (born 1990), American football running back
 Moses Dyer (born 1997), New Zealand association footballer
 Myles P. Dyer (1887–1969), American politician who served in the Missouri General Assembly
 Natalia Dyer (born 1995), American actress
 Nathan Dyer (born 1987) English footballer
 Nehemiah Dyer (1839–1910), Rear Admiral in United States Navy, who served during the American Civil War and Spanish–American War 
 Nick Dyer (born 1969), Scottish cricketer
 Peter Swinnerton-Dyer (1927–2018), British mathematician
 Reginald Dyer (1864–1927), British colonel, responsible for the Amritsar massacre
 Richard Dyer (born 1945), English academic in film studies
 Richard Dyer-Bennet (1913–1991) was an English-born American folk singer, recording artist, and voice teacher.
 Robert Allen Dyer (1900–1987), South African botanist
 Rolla Dyer (1886–1971), American physician
 Royce Coleman Dyer, (1889–1918), Canadian Captain that trained "Dyer's Battalion" and died during the North Russia Intervention
 Sarah Dyer, American comic book writer and artist
 Senimili Dyer, Fijian politician
 Samuel Dyer  (1804–1843), British Protestant Christian missionary to China in the Congregationalist tradition
 T. F. Thiselton-Dyer (1848–1923), British author
 Thomas Dyer (1805–1862), American politician, served as mayor of Chicago
 Thomas Henry Dyer (1804–1888), English historical and antiquarian writer
 Walter Alden Dyer (1878–1943), American author and journalist
 Wayne Dyer (1940–2015), American author and speaker
 Wayne Dyer (footballer) (born 1977), English footballer
 William Dyer (settler) (1609–by 1677), founding settler of Portsmouth and Newport, Rhode Island; husband of Mary Dyer
 William John Dyer (1830–1909), New Zealand businessman and politician.
 William Turner Thiselton-Dyer (1843–1928), British botanist

English-language surnames
Occupational surnames
English-language occupational surnames